Festival IGA Supermarkets (also known as Festival Supermarkets or Festival IGA) was a branding name for IGA. The name was launched in June 1992 by Davids Holdings [(now known as (Metcash) in Victoria. The first Festival IGA supermarkets were launched in Canberra on 26 October 1992 in Hackett, Lyneham, Florey, Charnwood, Kingston and Hawker.

Within 1995, more Festival IGA Supermarkets were opened throughout Canberra and New South Wales:  Deakin, Richardson, Kaleen, Jindabyne, Tumut, Merimbula, Moruya, Batemans Bay, Ainslie and Wanniassa.

By 1999, the Festival brand had disappeared and was renamed under the IGA banner. However, the IGA Supermarkets in Tasmania kept the Festival branding until at least 2012.

Slogans
 "Best and Fresh and Costs you Less"
 "The Friendly sized supermarket"

Logo
The logo for Festival IGA was the wording "Festival" in a red font with yellow shadowing in the background and there was a blue star on top of the "I".

References

Defunct supermarkets of Australia
Australian companies established in 1992
Food and drink companies established in 1992
Retail companies established in 1992
Retail companies disestablished in 1999
Australian grocers